The Lewis S. Hills House is a historic residence in Salt Lake City, Utah, United States, that is listed on the National Register of Historic Places (NRHP).

Description
The house, which has also been known as the Hogan Hotel, is located at 126 South 200 West and was build in 1885.  It is a "High Victorian Italianate" style house. From 1928 until the 1970s, the Hogar Hotel was a gathering place for Basque migrants. The structure is significant for its association with Lewis S. Hills, a financier who, among other activities, served as bank president of Deseret National Bank.

The structure was listed on the NRHP August 18, 1977. The residence is distinct from Lewis S. Hills House, which located at 425 East 100 South in Salt Lake City and is also listed on the NRHP.

See also

 National Register of Historic Places listings in Salt Lake City, Utah

References

External links

Houses on the National Register of Historic Places in Utah
Italianate architecture in Utah
Houses completed in 1885
Houses in Salt Lake City
National Register of Historic Places in Salt Lake City
1885 establishments in Utah Territory